FC Namys-APK Talas is a Kyrgyzstani football club based in Talas, Kyrgyzstan that played in the top division in Kyrgyzstan, the Kyrgyzstan League. The club plays its home games at Zhashtyk Stadion.

History 
1992: Founded as FC Namys-APK Talas.
1992: Dissolved.

Achievements 
Kyrgyzstan League:
9th place: 1992

Kyrgyzstan Cup:
1/8 finals: 1992

Current squad

See also
Football in Kyrgyzstan
List of football clubs in Kyrgyzstan

References

External links 
Profile at Footballfacts
Profile at Score!Hero

Football clubs in Kyrgyzstan
1992 establishments in Kyrgyzstan